A comparison of CalDAV and CardDAV implementations offers two overviews of client and server computer software implementations of the CalDAV and CardDAV protocols.

Client implementations

There are more clients, mentioned for completeness:
 For the command line: Vdirsyncer (for WebDAV) + Khal (for calendaring) or + Khard (for contacts)
 Apple's iCal and Calendar
 For Windows and Mac eM Client
 Windows built in-support (kind of)
 For the Web: Kronolith
 For Android: CalDAV Sync, CardDAV Sync, iCal Import/Export CalDAV

Server implementations

The table is missing Kopano, Kerio Connect and Scalix, which are mentioned here for completeness.

See also
 CalDAV
 CardDAV

References

Calendaring standards
Hypertext Transfer Protocol
Servers (computing)
Network software comparisons